Are We There Yet? Is a YA novel written by David Levithan. It was published in 2005 by Alfred A. Knopf.

Plot summary
The novel follows two brothers, Elijah and Danny, who have been tricked by their parents into taking a trip to Italy together. The brother's don't get along, as Elijah thinks Danny is stuffy and Danny thinks Elijah is lazy. In Venice, Elijah meets a girl named Julia, and he quickly devotes spending more time with her than with Danny. Julia is following the same trip schedule, and her and Elijah meet up in Florence and Rome. Danny spends much of his time alone in the cities, as Elijah is off with Julia, but is surprised when Julia returns to the brothers' hotel room and attempts to seduce Danny. Danny rejects her, and Elijah and Julia break up soon after. The brothers discover they have more in common then they thought and return home with a much better relationship.

Reception
Critical reception has been positive. The Birmingham Post and Booklist both gave Are We There Yet? favorable reviews, and The Birmingham Post wrote that it was "warm and funny".

References

2005 American novels
Novels by David Levithan